Sansing is a surname. Notable people with the surname include:

David Sansing (1933–2019), American historian and author
Mike Sansing, American collegiate baseball coach

See also
Sanxing (disambiguation), transliteration of a Chinese term